George H. Dickey (1858–1923) was an American lawyer from Valley City, North Dakota. He served in the Territorial House of Representatives of the Dakota Territory Legislative Assembly in 1881–1882. Dickey County, North Dakota is named in his honor.

Notes

1858 births
1923 deaths
People from Barnes County, North Dakota
Members of the Dakota Territorial Legislature
19th-century American politicians